Abdelouahab Maïche (born 30 November 1959) is an Algerian footballer. He played in 19 matches for the Algeria national football team in 1983 and 1989. He was also named in Algeria's squad for the 1988 African Cup of Nations tournament.

References

External links
 

1959 births
Living people
Algerian footballers
Algeria international footballers
1988 African Cup of Nations players
Place of birth missing (living people)
Association footballers not categorized by position
21st-century Algerian people